Melanophryniscus atroluteus is a species of toad in the family Bufonidae. It is found in northeastern Argentina, Uruguay, southern Paraguay, and southern Brazil (Rio Grande do Sul, presumably also Santa Catarina). While in the past it was considered a subspecies of Melanophryniscus stelzneri, it might rather be conspecific with Melanophryniscus montevidensis. Common name Uruguay redbelly toad (also spelled Uruguay red belly toad) has been coined for it.

Description
Males can reach  and females  in snout–vent length, although reported lengths are commonly slightly smaller. Skin is strongly granular. The dorsum is uniformly black, without blotches, while the belly is black and has red and/or yellow blotches. The throat is dark. Webbing is poorly developed.

Behavior
When threatened, this species exhibits the Unkenreflex behavior.

Habitat and conservation
Breeding is explosive and takes place in temporary pools and agricultural ditches.

In parts of its range (Argentina and Uruguay,), M. atroluteus is abundant during the breeding, but it is rare or uncommon elsewhere. It can occur in substantially disturbed habitats, but not in areas with intensive cattle activities. It is threatened by pine and Eucalyptus plantations and by drainage of wetlands. Pet trade might also become a threat. It does not appear to occur in any larger protected areas.

References

atroluteus
Amphibians of Argentina
Amphibians of Brazil
Amphibians of Paraguay
Amphibians of Uruguay
Taxa named by Alípio de Miranda-Ribeiro
Amphibians described in 1920
Taxonomy articles created by Polbot